Villawood may refer to:

 Villawood, New South Wales
 Villawood Immigration Detention Centre
 Villawood railway station

See also
 
 Valla Wood, a nature reserve in Linköping, Östergötland, Sweden